Otoko Uta: Cover Song Collection is Japanese pop singer Hitomi Shimatani's first cover album. It is available in both CD and CD+DVD format.

CD track listing
  (originally by Anzen Chitai)  
  (originally by Begin)
  (originally by Hideaki Tokunaga)  
 "Escape" (originally by Moon Child)
  (originally by Shinji Harada)  
  (originally by Original Love)
 "Another Orion" (originally by Fumiya Fujii)  
  (originally by Kōzō Murashita)  
 "One More Time, One More Chance" (originally by Masayoshi Yamazaki)  
  (originally by Eiichi Ohtaki) 
  (originally by Off Course) 
  (originally by Sukima Switch)
  (CD only edition extra track) (originally by Village Singers)

DVD track listing
 Another Orion
 Tsuki no Urade Aimashō (Let's Go to the Darkside of the Moon)
 Shiawase na Ketsumatsu
 Kotoba ni Dekinai
 Escape 
 Candy  
 Koishikute 
 Amairo no Kami no Otome
 One More Time, One More Chance
 Rainy Blue
 Kanashima ni Sayonara
 Hatsukoi
 Kanade

References

Hitomi Shimatani albums
2007 albums
Covers albums